Thomas Sanders McMillan (November 27, 1888 – September 29, 1939) was a lawyer and a United States Representative from South Carolina.

Born in the town of Ulmer in Allendale County, McMillan received his early childhood education at the schools in Ulmer. He graduated from the Orangeburg Collegiate Institute in 1907 and taught school for the next two years in Perry. McMillan then enrolled at the University of South Carolina and graduated in 1912. In 1913, he completed the law course at the university and was admitted to the bar the same year. He moved to Charleston where he began the practice of law on January 1, 1915, with James B. Heyward, as well as pursuing his agricultural interests.

McMillan served in the South Carolina House of Representatives from 1917 to 1924 and he served as speaker from 1923 to 1924. In addition, he was the head baseball coach at The Citadel from 1916 to 1919; for five years before law school, he had played professional minor league baseball with the South Atlantic League.

While serving in the United States Congress, McMillan maintained a house in Charleston, South Carolina at 171 Moultrie St. Today, the house is a contributing structure to the Hampton Park Terrace National Register Historic District and is used as a faculty house for the Citadel.

He was elected to the United States House of Representatives to represent the 1st congressional district in 1924 for the Sixty-ninth Congress. He was re-elected six more times and while in Congress was a member of the executive committee of the Inter-Parliamentary Union from 1937 to 1939. McMillan died in Charleston and was interred in Magnolia Cemetery.

See also
 List of United States Congress members who died in office (1900–49)

References
Yates Snowden, History of South Carolina (1920).

External links
 
 

1888 births
1939 deaths
Baseball players from South Carolina
Charlotte Hornets (baseball) players
Charleston Sea Gulls players
Democratic Party members of the South Carolina House of Representatives
South Carolina lawyers
The Citadel Bulldogs baseball coaches
University of South Carolina alumni
People from Allendale County, South Carolina
Democratic Party members of the United States House of Representatives from South Carolina
20th-century American politicians
20th-century American lawyers